Augusta of Prussia (Christine Friederike Auguste; 1 May 1780 – 19 February 1841) was a German salonist, painter, and Electress consort of Hesse by marriage to William II, Elector of Hesse. She was the third daughter and fifth child of Frederick William II of Prussia and Frederika Louisa of Hesse-Darmstadt.

Biography

On 13 February 1797 in Berlin, Augusta married Prince William of Hesse-Kassel, eldest surviving son of William IX, Landgrave of Hesse-Kassel.   In 1803, the Landgrave was raised to Elector of Hesse, and Prince William succeeded on his father's death in 1821.

The marriage of Augusta was politically arranged and unhappy. Augusta and William often came into conflict with one another, which led to aggressive confrontations. 

In 1806, Hesse was occupied by France. Augusta was in Berlin with her children at the time, having remained in the Prussian capital due to her pregnancy when Napoleon's army took it for France. Napoleon put guards around her house and gave orders that she should not be disturbed. With Hesse and Prussia occupied and her family in exile, Augusta lacked money, and after her child's birth she asked for a meeting with Napoleon. She appeared before him with her newborn baby on her arm and one of her children by the hand and asked him for an allowance, which he granted her.

After the birth of her last child in 1806, the relationship between Augusta and William was unofficially terminated. In 1815, they agreed to keep separate households. Augusta lived in Schoenfeld Palace, where she became a celebrated salonist and the centre of the romantic Schoenfelder-circle, which included Ludwig Hassenpflug, Joseph von Radowitz and the Grimm brothers, while William lived in a different residence with his mistress, Emilie Ortlöpp. 

Auguste closed her salon in 1823, and between 1826 and 1831 she lived in The Hague, Koblenz, Bonn and Fulda. She returned to Kassel in 1831. Augusta was regarded as a skillful painter, whose works included self-portraits.

Several months after Augusta's death, William morganatically remarried his longtime mistress Emilie Ortlöpp, ennobled as Countess von Reichenbach-Lessonitz, by whom he had an additional eight children.

Issue
Wilhelm (9 April 1798 – 25 October 1800)
 Karoline (29 July 1799 – 28 November 1854)
 Luise (3 April 1801 – 28 September 1803)
 Frederick William, Elector of Hesse (20 August 1802 – 6 June 1875) morganatically married Gertrude Lehmann.
 Marie (6 September 1804 – 4 January 1888), married Bernhard II, Duke of Saxe-Meiningen and had issue.
 Ferdinand (9 October 1806 – 21 November 1806)

Ancestry

Notes

External links

|-

|-

1780 births
1841 deaths
House of Hohenzollern
Prussian princesses
People from Potsdam
Hereditary Princesses of Hesse-Kassel
Landgravines of Hesse-Kassel
Electresses of Hesse
German salon-holders
18th-century Prussian people
18th-century Prussian women
19th-century Prussian people
19th-century Prussian women
Daughters of kings